Charles Martin Smith (born October 30, 1953) is an American actor, writer, and director of film and television, based in British Columbia. He is known for his roles in American Graffiti (1973), The Buddy Holly Story (1978), Never Cry Wolf (1983), Starman (1984), The Untouchables (1987), Deep Cover (1992), And the Band Played On (1993), Speechless (1994) and Deep Impact (1998). 

As a director, he is further known for the films The Snow Walker (2003), Stone of Destiny (2008), Dolphin Tale (2011), Dolphin Tale 2 (2014) and A Dog's Way Home (2019). His directorial work has earned him much acclaim, with BAFTA Scotland, Genie nominations, and numerous Leo Award nominations.

Biography

Early life
Smith was born in Van Nuys, California. His father, Frank Smith, was a film cartoonist and animator, while his uncle Paul J. Smith was an animator as well as a director for the Walter Lantz Studios. Smith spent three years of his youth in Paris, where his father managed the English-language branch of a French animation studio. He received his high school diploma from Grover Cleveland High School in Reseda, California. He attended California State University, Northridge and was awarded a B.A. in Theatre.

Acting background
Smith was discovered by a talent agent while acting in a school play, Man of La Mancha. After a few years of working in film and television, he landed the role of Terry "The Toad" Fields in George Lucas's 1973 film American Graffiti, a role he reprised in the film's 1979 sequel, More American Graffiti.

In 1973, he and American Graffiti co-star Cindy Williams appeared together in an episode of Love, American Style titled "Love and the Time Machine".

In 1974 he starred with Ron Howard in The Spikes Gang, filmed in Spain, along with Lee Marvin and Gary Grimes; and in 1978 he earned a starring role in Cotton Candy, directed by Howard.

Smith played one of Buddy Holly's bandmates in The Buddy Holly Story, a race car driver in Disney's Herbie Goes Bananas, and the starring role as a scientist in Never Cry Wolf. His work in Starman, as Mark Shermin, a SETI member sympathetic to the title character's plight, was also lauded. In 1979 Smith was cast alongside Barney Martin as the lead in Norman Lear's last television series concept, McGurk: A Dog's Life, which never progressed beyond the pilot.

Another role was in "Banshee," an episode of The Ray Bradbury Theater that costarred Peter O'Toole and Jennifer Dale. He also appeared in the episode "Boys! Raise Giant Mushrooms in Your Cellar". One of his later starring roles was in "The Beacon," an episode of The Twilight Zone where he starred with Martin Landau and Giovanni Ribisi in an early role.

He was in The Untouchables. After this he co-starred in The Hot Spot and Deep Cover, and in the mid-1990s he appeared in films such as Speechless, I Love Trouble, and Perfect Alibi.

Smith played a role in the HBO film And the Band Played On, then turned in a performance in the TV miniseries Streets of Laredo.

He also appeared in The Beast in 1996 and in a minor role in the big budget Deep Impact in 1998. He played a major character in the made-for-television movie Blackout Effect.

More recently he has appeared in mini-series such as P.T. Barnum, Kingdom Hospital and The Triangle as well as the feature film Lucky You directed by Curtis Hanson. In 2009 he played a featured role, Sheriff Golightly, in the second episode of season two of the TV series Fringe.

Never Cry Wolf (1983)
Smith devoted almost three years to filming Never Cry Wolf, adapted from a memoir by environmentalist Farley Mowat. Smith said, "I was much more closely involved in that picture than I had been in any other film. Not only acting, but writing and the whole creative process." He also found the process difficult. "During much of the two-year shooting schedule in Canada's Yukon and in Nome, Alaska, I was the only actor present. It was the loneliest film I've ever worked on." During the filming, he became so enamored of the Northwest that he decided to relocate to Vancouver, British Columbia, where he has resided since the mid-1980s.

Carroll Ballard, director of Never Cry Wolf, asked Smith to write much of the narration for the film. Smith also performed in a lengthy scene with wolves and caribou in which he was entirely naked. While working on this production, Smith formed a friendship with the author, Farley Mowat, which lasted until Mowat's death in 2014.

Directing
Along with his acting career, since the mid-1990s Smith has increasingly focused on his work behind the camera both as a writer and director. His first film as director was the camp horror story Trick or Treat (1986) for Dino De Laurentiis, in which he also appeared. In 1992, he directed and acted in Fifty/Fifty, a movie filmed in Malaysia which also starred Robert Hays and Peter Weller. He was one of the directors of the TV series Space: Above and Beyond (1995) as well as the director of the initial episode ("Welcome to the Hellmouth") that launched the TV series Buffy the Vampire Slayer (1997). He next directed the successful feature film Air Bud (Disney, 1997), and two TV miniseries for Hallmark Entertainment, Roughing It, starring James Garner as Mark Twain, (2001) and Icon (2005), starring Patrick Swayze, Michael York and Patrick Bergin. He directed numerous episodes of the Canadian television series DaVinci's Inquest, and wrote and executive produced The Clinic, a film about a veterinary clinic for Animal Planet in 2003.

In 2003 he wrote and directed the acclaimed Canadian feature film The Snow Walker for Lions Gate Films, based on a story by Farley Mowat, which marked a return to the Arctic for Smith and garnered nine Genie Award nominations including Best Picture, Best Adapted Screenplay, and Best Director for Smith.

In 2007, Smith wrote and directed the British/Canadian co-production Stone of Destiny for Mob Films, and Infinity Features, starring Charlie Cox, Robert Carlyle and Kate Mara. Stone of Destiny was the closing Gala Presentation for the 2008 Toronto International Film Festival. His next film was Dolphin Tale for Alcon Entertainment. The film, based on a true story, stars Harry Connick Jr., Ashley Judd, Morgan Freeman, Kris Kristofferson, Nathan Gamble and Cozi Zuehlsdorff, and was released on September 23, 2011 by Warner Bros.  To date, the film has grossed over $70 million at the domestic box office and over $100 million worldwide.

He returned to write and direct the sequel, Dolphin Tale 2. He based his original script on various true-life events that have occurred at the Clearwater Marine Hospital, including the dramatic rescue of a baby dolphin named "Hope" that coincidentally happened during the wrap party of the first film, with many of the film's cast and crew watching. The entire cast returned to take part, and the movie was released by Warner Bros on September 12, 2014.

Filmography

Television credits

Notes

References

External links
 

1953 births
Living people
California State University, Northridge alumni
American male film actors
American male television actors
American television directors
Film directors from British Columbia
People from Van Nuys, Los Angeles
American expatriates in Canada
20th-century American male actors
21st-century American male actors
Film directors from Los Angeles